The January 2019 North American winter storm was a long-lived winter storm, forming as a large area of low pressure off the Pacific Northwest shoreline January 16, making its way to the Northeast by January 21. Its effects included heavy rain/high elevation snow and gusty winds in California, severe weather in the south, near-blizzard conditions in Upstate New York, an ice storm in New England and minor coastal flooding in the Mid-Atlantic.

Meteorological history
A large area of low pressure formed just off the coast of the Pacific Northwest January 16th, before making landfall in California January 17th. Very heavy, high-elevation snow fell in the Sierra Nevada and Rocky Mountain ranges. The storm tracked across the Great Plains and through the Midwest before delivering heavy snow to the mountains of Upstate New York and Northern New England, eventually moving through Atlantic Canada and drifting out to sea. The Winter Storm was Named Harper by the Weather Channel.

Impacts

California
The storm entered North America via California, as it made landfall January 16th and 17th. Moisture from the storm caused heavy, high elevation snow in the Sierra Nevada mountain range, peaking at 52 inches (130 cm) in Squaw Valley. Winds gusted up to 162 mph (263 km/h) at the top of Mammoth Mountain. The powerful winds knocked out power to 97,000 statewide.

Colorado
The Rocky Mountains in Colorado also experienced heavy snow, although lighter than in California.

North Dakota & South Dakota
Light to moderate snow and gusty winds affected travel across the states.

Missouri

Travel was halted by the storm in Missouri. 575 motorists were stranded, 285 car accidents occurred, 43 people were injured and two suffered fatal injuries.

Indiana

Ice accumulation followed a period of freezing rain.

Minnesota

In Minnesota, there were five reported collisions with snow plows by cars in 24 hours.

New York
A band of heavy snow resulted in the accumulation of 1 to 2 feet (30 to 60 cm) of snow in Upstate New York, primarily in the mountains.

Vermont and New Hampshire
Heavy snow fell in much of both states.

Connecticut
The storm affected the state as an ice storm.  Ice accumulations peaked at 1/6 of an inch. Power outages and tree damage affected the places hit worst.

Massachusetts
Springfield, Massachusetts reported  a quarter inch of ice accretion. In Cape Cod, mostly rain occurred.

Maine
The heaviest snow in the Northeast from the storm fell in Maine, with some localities reporting more than 2 feet (60 cm+) of snow.

Pennsylvania
Pennsylvania Governor Tom Wolf declared a state of emergency ahead of the storm, expecting snowfall rates up to 2 inches (5 cm) per hour. A 24-hour commercial vehicle ban was put in place for all interstates besides I-95, although speed limits were reduced.

New Jersey
A state of emergency was declared days before the storm hit.

Tornado outbreak in the southeast
At the southern end of the cold front, multiple states in the southeast and on the Gulf Coast  were impacted by a small, early-season tornado outbreak. 10 tornadoes touched down across the affected states.

Louisiana

An EF-1, with 105 mph winds, uprooted trees and damaged homes in Washington Parish.

Mississippi

Rankin county was hit with an EF-0 earlier in the day before being struck again, this time by an EF-1, a few hours later.

Alabama

The town of Wetumpka was impacted by an EF-2 tornado. The town's mayor, Jerry Willis said at a news conference that the town "suffered a tremendous amount of damage." Four injuries were reported. The historic First Presbyterian Church in Wetumpka was destroyed. The state was hit with two other tornadoes, both rated EF-1, touching down in Autauga and Coosa counties.

Florida
Tyndall AFB, which had already been devastated by Hurricane Michael 3 months prior, reported EF-1 tornado damage.

See also

 March 2019 North American blizzard – another powerful winter storm/blizzard that affected the United States and Eastern Canada less than 2 months after
 January 2019 North American cold wave – the cold wave that followed this winter storm

References

2019 natural disasters in the United States
2018–19 North American winter
Storms
January 2019 events in the United States